Joshua "Josh" Johnson (born 25 July 1994) is an English professional rugby league soccer-player who plays as a  for the Bradford Bulls in the Betfred Championship.

He has previously played for the Huddersfield Giants in the Super League, and on loan from Huddersfield at Doncaster and the Batley Bulldogs in the Championship, and Oldham (Heritage № 1340) in Championship 1. Johnson played for Hull Kingston Rovers in the Kingstone Press Championship and in the top flight, and on loan from Hull KR at the York City Knights in Betfred League 1 and the Leigh Centurions in the Betfred Championship. He also played for the Barrow Raiders in the Championship.

Background
Johnson was born in Huddersfield, West Yorkshire, England. Johnson has previously played for the Saddleworth Rangers.

Senior career

Huddersfield Giants (2013-16)
Johnson made his Huddersfield Giants' Super League début on 4 August 2013, in a match against the Salford Red Devils at the John Smiths Stadium.

Doncaster R.L.F.C. (2013)
Johnson's senior rugby league début came during a dual-registration spell at part-timers Doncaster R.L.F.C. in the 2013 season.

Batley Bulldogs (2013-14)
In 2013 and 2014, Johnson also played as part of a loan deal with Championship club Batley.

Oldham (2015)
The 2015 season saw Johnson play for the OLdham on a dual-registration basis.

Hull Kingston Rovers (2017-19)

2017
Johnson made his Hull Kingston Rovers' début on 2 April 2017, in a 50-16 Championship league victory.

Johnson was part of the Hull Kingston Rovers side that won promotion back to the Super League, at the first time of asking following relegation the season prior.

2018-19
Struggling for regular game time during the 2018 Super League season and with no promise of that changing during the 2019 campaign, it was revealed on 25 January 2019, that Johnson had been released from his contract (to seek regular game time elsewhere) at Hull Kingston Rovers by mutual consent.

York City Knights (2018)
Johnson also featured for York City on several occasions during the 2018 season, as part of Hull Kingston Rovers dual-registration agreement with the club.

Leigh Centurions (2018)
It was revealed on 26 July 2018, that Johnson would spend the remainder of the 2018 rugby league season at Leigh, on a loan basis from his parent-club Hull Kingston Rovers. Johnson was followed to Leigh by two of his current Hull Kingston Rovers teammates in Will Dagger and Jordan Walne as part of the same loan deal.

Barrow Raiders (2019 - present)
It was revealed on 31 January 2019, that Johnson had signed a deal to join the Barrow Raiders on a one-year contract, that included a release clause should he receive a full-time offer from another club. Johnson made his début for Barrow on 3 February 2019, in a 18–22 victory over Batley.

References

External links
Hull Kingston Rovers profile
Huddersfield Giants profile
SL profile

1994 births
Living people
Barrow Raiders players
Batley Bulldogs players
Bradford Bulls players
Doncaster R.L.F.C. players
English rugby league players
Huddersfield Giants players
Hull Kingston Rovers players
Leigh Leopards players
Oldham R.L.F.C. players
Rugby league players from Huddersfield
Rugby league props
Salford Red Devils players
Widnes Vikings players
York City Knights players